Schnitzer Steel Industries, Inc. is a steel manufacturing and scrap metal recycling company headquartered in Portland, Oregon.

History
Schnitzer Steel was founded by Russian immigrant Sam Schnitzer in 1906 as a one-person scrap metal recycler. Between 1947 and 1950, his son, Harold Schnitzer, worked at the company.

In 1993, Schnitzer Steel became a public company via an initial public offering. In January 2003, the company acquired Pick-n-Pull. In October 2005, it acquired GreenLeaf Auto Recyclers, which was sold in 2009, and Regional Recycling, a metals recycling business with 10 locations in the Southeastern United States. In 2006, the company acquired Advanced Recycling.

In December 2007, the U.S. Securities and Exchange Commission charged former chairman and CEO Robert Philip for violating bribery laws as part of the Foreign Corrupt Practices Act in relation to dealings with Chinese steel mills.

Tamara Lundgren became the chief executive officer, and John Carter became chairman in November 2008.

In January 2010, the Schnitzer family sold their shares such that their ownership in the company fell below 20%. In April 2010, the company acquired Golden Recycling & Salvage, a recycling company in Billings, Montana.

In 2011, the company acquired State Line Scrap Co., a recycling company in Attleboro, Massachusetts, and Ferrill's Auto Parts of Seattle.

In 2013, the company moved its headquarters to downtown Portland, Oregon.

See also
 List of companies based in Oregon
 List of steel producers

References

External links

1906 establishments in Oregon
Companies based in St. Johns, Portland, Oregon
1993 initial public offerings
Companies listed on the Nasdaq
Manufacturing companies based in Portland, Oregon
Manufacturing companies established in 1906
Steel companies of the United States